Vyacheslav Loginov (born January 9, 1979, Poyarkovo, Amur Oblast) is a Russian political figure and a deputy of the 8th State Duma.

In 2008-2012, Loginov occupied various positions at the Legislative Assembly of Amur Oblast, starting from the adviser to the chairman and to the deputy head of the apparatus. From 2009 to 2011, he worked as a senior lecturer at the Far East State Agrarian University. In 2013-2016, Loginov was a senior lecturer at the Department of Economics and Management of Organizations of the Amur State University. On September 18, 2016, he was elected deputy of the Legislative Assembly of Amur Oblast of the 7th convocation. On January 24, 2019, Loginov was appointed Chairman of the Legislative Assembly of the Amur Region. Since September 2021, he has served as deputy of the 8th State Duma.

References

1979 births
Living people
United Russia politicians
21st-century Russian politicians
Eighth convocation members of the State Duma (Russian Federation)
People from Amur Oblast
Russian Presidential Academy of National Economy and Public Administration alumni